Carl Geppert was a German actor. He appeared in more than fifty films from 1919 to 1932.

Selected filmography

References

External links 

Postcard

Date of birth unknown
Date of death unknown
German male film actors
German male silent film actors
20th-century German male actors